Pink Dot is a quick delivery prepared-to-order grocery store based on the Sunset Strip in West Hollywood, California. The store has appeared in several movies and television shows, including HBO's Entourage.

History
Entrepreneur Bill Toro founded the chain in 1987 with the purchase of a single liquor store. His idea to create a delivery-based operation arose from numerous complaints he observed about the traffic in Los Angeles. Pink Dot is a privately owned corporation with Toro retaining 30% control.

In 1996, Pink Dot was referred to as a rapidly expanding grocery delivery company in a Los Angeles Times story that noted the store guaranteed delivery within 45 minutes for a service charge of $9.99. Orders were filled from five warehouses. Company executives at the time predicted home delivery would become a "big part of the changing face of retail."

As Pink Dot prepared to expand into Orange County, the company phased out its signature polka-dotted, propeller-topped Volkswagen Beetle delivery cars after market tests showed that Orange County residents wanted their purchases delivered in more low-profile vehicles.

Pink Dot partnered with order takers such as the now-defunct Kozmo.com, which went defunct in the bursting of the dot-com bubble, as a way to expand the product line into items such as Compact Discs and pharmaceuticals.

Late 2000s
In 2008, Pink Dot announced a partnership with Ford Motor Company and began using the Ford Transit Connect, a delivery system that Pink Dot president Sol Yamini described as "room service for your home." Later, Pink Dot partnered with Postmates to extend its offerings to app users.

References

External links
Pink Dot homepage

Retail companies established in 1987
Companies based in Los Angeles County, California
Online food retailers of the United States